Franzi Hato Hasbún Barake (1946 in San Salvador – 30 August 2017) was a Salvadoran politician of Palestinian origin

He was a noted sociologist, a specialist in political, electoral, international cooperation and public opinion. Hasbún has Masters in Sociology, Philosophy and Journalism Research. Since 2009 he holds the reins of the Secretariat of Strategic Affairs of the Presidency.

From July 2012 holds the post of Minister of Education, after the vice-president, Salvador Sanchez Ceren, renounce the ministry of state. The secretary also served as an advisor to the rectory in the Jose Simeon Canas Central American University (UCA) and project manager ; he was professor of sociology of the current Salvadoran president while studying at the Externado San Jose school.

Salvadoran Kingmaker
Hato Franzi Hasbún is and will be, one of the most emblematic figures of the socio-political history of the country and more recently, certainly, the nearest officer to President Mauricio Funes.

Those who have known young, still remember him as a devoted basketball star while studying at the Salvadoran Grammar school and more than one followed suit to excel in this discipline. Optometrist by profession, but always interested in cultivating knowledge, Hasbún decides to study at American University (UCA) perhaps attracted by the so-called revolutionary currents that drove the Jesuits, although it posed was the conscience of men to decision, after "discovering their mission and carry it out" on the basis of the gospel.

Among its successes is the first academic degree in Sociology, UCA, and a BA in Philosophy from the Autonomous University of Mexico.

There is no certainty the years after winning their college credits he decided to become professor of Externado San Jose, however, some remember him for the scandal generated between faculty and parents to replicate Marxist theories and Liberation theology inherited by their teachers.

The enormous impact of his teachings in the Externado have caused irreconcilable fractures, to the point that some parents wealthy -along with teachers-the institution decided to leave and form their own. At that point is, for example, the rise of school La Floresta, one of the most exclusive schools for girls.

In his academic career two Masters are then added:. In Sociology, at the Complutense University of Madrid, and Philosophy at the Pontifical University of Comillas, both of Spain.

Wartime
Hasbún joined the ranks of the People (FPL), one of five guerrilla organizations then Liberation Forces. All his work was called "diplomatic fronts" who did travel to various countries in Latin America and Europe, although it is recognized that the major link was with Cuba -the characters hotbed of communism, including the brothers Fidel Castro and Raul Castro.

It was reported that Manuel Pineiro, the commander Barbarossa was very close to Hato Hasbún. Pineiro was considered a leading figure of the Cuban Revolution as responsible for the construction of the security apparatus of the island and the expansion of leftist groups in Latin America.

Barbarossa was born in Matanzas, the March 14, 1933, and died in Havana on 11 March 1998. After his death, also served as the strongman of the Castro, Ramiro Abreu, who is officially the Delegate of Cuba to Central America.

Abreu has repeatedly visited our country, independent of the short time remaining in Salvadoran soil always reserved a space to talk with Hasbún.

During the war, Hato would have used his position as Secretary of International Relations of the UCA to work on behalf of the then guerrilla. This would have caused some problems with the Jesuit company, which were overcome as he held various positions within the school during and after armed conflict.

One of his greatest contributions at the end of the 80s would have brought a first proposed solution to the armed conflict. The initiative was designed in Mexico, with input from Jesuit priests, and this is where lies the latest version of the Peace Accords.

Life communicator? 
Between 1992 and 1996, Hato Hasbún was Dean of Students, Director of Projects and International Relations Advisor to the Rector and professor in the departments of Philosophy and Sociology at the American University.

In that period he would have strengthened the friendship with former student of Arts and novel journalist Carlos Mauricio Funes Cartagena, born on October 18, 1959 in San Salvador.

Funes began his journalistic practice in 1986 as a reporter for Noticiero Tele 10 state program Channel 10. A year later, the news daily, Channel 12, which stresses their responsibility in covering political issues from the Legislative Assembly was incorporated. He stayed for four years with Channel 12.

In 1991, the Foundation collaborates Hasbún Center Video-now known as UCA audiovisuals- Center and Funes called to participate in the project.

In the years after the partnership between Hato Hasbún is accentuated and Mauricio Funes, which also shows how both have climbed slowly and have dealt with various tasks to survive.

From 1993-2005, Hato Hasbún joins the interview a day, Channel 12, and when Funes relaunches its space as "Interview with Mauricio Funes", between 2005 and 2007, its mentor becomes CEO and Director of Research.

No doubt selected for the TV program or how to approach these issues marked a differentiator young journalist, to profiling it as one of the best. It is perhaps in this period where the fine work of his disciple Hasbún note, along with the tenacity of a journalist.

Between those years, 2005 and 2007 Hasbún is the Program Director of Surveys CS-polls. A company where he also works Funes Cartagena and whose measurements have served to feed the journalistic work of the interviewer.

Political arena
In 1997, it reminds one of the public appearances of Hato Hasbún, which matches the gain of the late Hector Silva in the mayor's office. Apparently Hasbún have collaborated with the campaign who will always be remembered as the "first mayor left" in the history of El Salvador.

Hasbún is unknown how long worked with Silva and level of impact it had on their municipal work, but maybe helped Silva developed to the point that large urban projects that agenciaron a new building complex period in 2000.

For 2007, Hasbún already contained closely with the possible presidential candidacy of Mauricio Funes, who was confirmed before the end of that year.

2009 would be the presidential and the FMLN -after previous- failure was determined to wrest the Executive to ARENA who has already ruled the country for 20 years.

After the feedback of March, the flow of votes for Funes and his arrival in the presidency confirmed. His mentor, Hato Hasbún, won a close position and became Secretary of Strategic Affairs, a position was created for him.

"As Secretary for Strategic Affairs he directs efforts to modernize the State, the ballot initiative from the outside, mechanisms of accountability, combating corruption and territorial development. It also helped resolve specific conflicts in various areas of the administration" Funes said a few days ago to appoint his former teacher as Minister of Education honorary, replacing Salvador Sanchez Ceren who decided to leave the position to become the presidential letter FMLN 2014.

Hasbún has tried thorny issues such as subsidies, modernizing the transport sector and the review of pensions, among others. Plays a key role in the administration of Funes and sometimes acted as spokesman for the President when making key decisions.

No doubt all this and more, Franzi Hasbún Hato deserves to be called the most respectable of the "kingmaker" Salvadorans. The term was first applied to Richard Neville, 16th Earl of Warwick,- "Warwick the Kingmaker" - who played a decisive role during the "War of the Roses" in England, which occurred between 1445 and 1485.

References 

Artículo en El Mundo
LaPágina.com 

1946 births
2017 deaths
Farabundo Martí National Liberation Front politicians
People from San Salvador Department
Salvadoran people of Palestinian descent
Salvadoran Roman Catholics
People from Bethlehem